Margaret Thomas (born Margaret Cook; 23 December 1842 – 24 December 1929) was an English-born Australian travel writer, poet and artist. Thomas was born at Croydon, Surrey, daughter of Thomas Cook, shipowner. Her date of birth is often cited incorrectly as 1843 and she was herself inconsistent about both her age and date of birth. It has also been discovered that she was originally named Margaret Cook and only later changed her surname to her father's first name.

Career

Margaret Cook was brought to Australia by her parents in 1852 and later on studied sculpture under Charles Summers at Melbourne. She exhibited a medallion portrait at the first exhibition of the Victorian Society of Fine Arts held in 1857. Thomas lived in Richmond, Victoria and exhibited her work regularly.

Around 1867, Thomas went to Europe to continue her studies. She had a medallion shown at the Royal Academy exhibition of 1868; after studying for three years at Rome she obtained a studentship at the Royal Academy, London, and in 1872 won the silver medal for sculpture.

Between 1868 and 1880, Thomas exhibited her paintings (mostly portraits) at the Royal Academy. In 1880 Thomas wrote a memoir of Charles Summers, her first master, A Hero of the Workshop, and in the same year completed a bust of him for the shire hall, Taunton. She afterwards did busts of Henry Fielding and other distinguished Somerset men for the same place. She began contributing verse to periodicals and in 1888 Douglas Sladen included seven of her poems in his Australian Poets. Thomas is also believed to have painted a number of middle eastern watercolours with a curious monogram consisting of an inverted L or Greek gamma (Γ) over a gothic M.

In 1888, Thomas left England for Brittany and subsequently Rome, accompanied by her long-term companion Henrietta Pilkington (1848-1927). During the 1890s, they travelled throughout the Middle East and her book A Scamper through Spain and Tangier (1892) was dedicated to My dear friend, the companion of these wanderings. This book and Two Years in Palestine and Syria (1899), were illustrated by the author. In 1902 appeared an interesting little book, Denmark Past and Present, which was followed by How to Judge Pictures (1906), and a collection of her verse, A Painter's Pastime (1908). 

In 1911, appeared what was possibly her most valuable piece of work, How to Understand Sculpture. Another volume of verse, Friendship, Poems in Memoriam, was published in 1927 after the death of Henrietta Pilkington. She did a large number of illustrations in colour for From Damascus to Palmyra, by John Kelman (1908). Thomas did not marry, although she spent much of her adult life with Henrietta Pilkington. The pair moved to Norton, Hertfordshire in 1911, living in a cottage known as Countryside in Croft Lane, where Thomas died on 24 December 1929, the day after her 87th birthday. She was buried with Pilkington, who had died two years before, in Norton churchyard. Several of her sculptures and 27 of her paintings are in the collections of North Hertfordshire Museum, which also contains works by Pilkington.

Australia

Margaret Thomas's painting of Charles Summers, c. 1879 was the first portrait of an Australian artist to enter the National Gallery of Victoria collection, notably it was also the first oil painting by an Australian female artist acquired by the National Gallery of Victoria in 1881. Thomas' portrait in oils of Charles Summers, and a medallion portrait of Sir Redmond Barry, are in the historical collection at the State Library of Victoria, Melbourne.

References

Sources

"Mysterious Margaret" by John Ramm in Antique Dealer & Collectors Guide, vol 59, Nos 2&3 (Sept/Oct 2005)

External links
 
 The New English Art Club: Margaret Thomas
 The Royal Society of British Artists
 Australian Dictionary of Biography
 NGV: Portrait of the artist as hero: Margaret Thomas’s portraits of Charles Summers

1842 births
1929 deaths
Australian poets
20th-century Australian sculptors
Australian non-fiction writers
Australian illustrators
Australian travel writers
Australian women illustrators
Australian women painters
Women travel writers
English emigrants to Australia
People from Croydon
Writers from Victoria (Australia)
People from Richmond, Victoria
Australian women poets
19th-century Australian painters
20th-century Australian painters
19th-century sculptors
19th-century Australian women artists
20th-century Australian women artists